Berryteuthis is a genus of squid in the family Gonatidae, comprising two known species. The two members differ greatly in size, with B. anonychus and B. magister reaching mature mantle lengths of 10 cm and 40 cm respectively. In both members, photophores are absent.

Species
Berryteuthis anonychus (Pearcy & Voss, 1963), minimal armhook squid
Berryteuthis magister (Berry, 1913)
Berryteuthis magister magister, magister armhook squid
Berryteuthis magister nipponensis
Berryteuthis magister shevtsovi

References

External links
Tree of Life web project: Berryteuthis

Squid
Taxa named by Adolf Naef
Cephalopod genera